Sir Walter Sandys (–1435) was an English politician, MP for Hampshire.

Sandys was the eldest son of Sir John Sandys .

He married firstly Agnes, daughter of Thomas Warrener; and secondly Margaret, daughter of John Erleigh, widow of John Seymour.

He served as High Sheriff of Hampshire 1410–11 and 1423–24, MP for Hampshire in the Parliament of April 1414, and JP for Hampshire 1416–24 and 1431 until death.

References

1370s births
1435 deaths
English MPs April 1414
English justices of the peace
High Sheriffs of Hampshire